Jaintiapur is an upazila of Sylhet District in the Division of Sylhet, Bangladesh.

History
Pan, Pani Nari- Ei tiney Jaintapuri- Betel, water and women, these three make Jaintapuri. That's the first line of a rhyme that has become something of a catchphrase among Sylhetis to describe Jaintiapur, a historically rich upazila of Sylhet.

A long time ago, the present plain land was probably under water and part of a huge water body, which might have separated Jaintiapur from Sylhet, historians say. Because of this geophysical condition, the region remained independent for a long time and was known as the Jaintia Kingdom. Jaintia (Sutnga kingdom) was a hill kingdom of ancient Meghalaya. In the sixteenth century, most of the greater Sylhet region was under the jurisdiction of Jaintia king who ruled from the capital Jaintiapur. The inhabiting Khasi people (ethnic group) had a matriarchal society and its own language. Sometime around 1500, the then king Parbat Roy adopted his Sanskrit name. The king of Cooch Bihar conquered Jaintia sometime between 1548 and 1564. Late that century, the Jaintia kingdom was governed under the kingdom of Cachhar Raja. The Jaintia kingdom regained independence in 1605 with the help of Ahom Raja. Lakshmi Narayan was a strong king (1669-1697) who was famous for the construction of buildings using bricks at his capital at Jaintiapur. The British East India Company drove the Jaintia king from the plains of Sylhet in 1765. The kingdom lost its independence when the Burmese conquered Assam in 1824. Again the British drove the Burmese away while the kingdom's independence was restored in 1825. To facilitate their trade of limestone and canes in Sylhet, the East India Company annexed the Jaintia kingdom to their Bengal state in 1835.

According to the local legends and folk tales, from the seventh or eighth
century, the Jaintiapur kingdom came under the control of the Kamrup Kingdom and later the same year under the control Chandra and Varman rulers. After the fall of Varmans, the kingdom again went under the rule of the Deva dynasty for some time. Jayanta Roy, the last ruler of the Deva dynasty had a daughter named Joyonti, who was married to a son of Khasi chief-Landowner. Because of this marriage, the kingdom came under the ruling of the Khasi in around 1500. It remained as an independent kingdom under the Khasi till 1824.

There are still plenty of visitor attractions at the remains of Jaintiapur, which include the temple of Jainteswari, the Rajbari (palace) and the monuments. These remnants, however, are now quite dilapidated. The palace built by King Lakshmi Sinha (1670-1701) in 1680 is ruined. The main structure of the temple has also been heavily damaged. However, the temple area has a boundary wall now. Some of the ancient monuments at Jaintiapur are sites of tremendous historical interest. The lone megalithic remains discovered so far in Bangladesh are located in Jaintiapur. They are similar to the ones discovered in India.

There are 42 structures around the Jainteswari temple area (located very close to the Jaintiapur bus stand). Among them, nineteen megaliths can be seen by the side of the temple. There are eight structures near the Jaintiapur Shahid Minar area while there are many others in broken pieces. Five stands at the southern side of the Sylhet-Tamabil Road.

There are seven other structures at a place about one and a half kilometers off the Jainteswari temple and near the northern side of the Nayagang River.
Many of the remains

1971 War

In 1971 the Pakistani Army engaged in torture, genocide, and plundering; soldiers also set many houses of the upazila on fire. The Pakistani Army killed a number of innocent persons at the village of Hemo by strafing via fighter planes. Additionally, the Pakistani Army brutally killed 30 persons including the Khan Tea Garden workers.

Geography

area 280.27 km2, located in between 24'59' and 25'11' north latitudes and in between 92'03' and 92'14' east longitudes. It is bounded by Meghalaya State of India on the north, Kanaighat and Golapganj upazilas on the south, Kanaighat Upazila on the east, Gowainghat and Sylhet Sadar Upazila on the west. The Jaflong Hills Range is located on the northeast of the upazila.

Demographics

As of the 2011 Bangladesh census, Jaintiapur has a population of 121458. Males constitute 63254 of the population, and females 58204. Muslim 109123, Hindu 12066, Buddhist 92, Christian 17 and others 160. Indigenous community such as khasia belongs to this upazila.

Economy

Agriculture 53.38%, non-agricultural labourer 10.32%, industry 0.70%, commerce 12.60%, transport and communication 1.79%, service 4.71%, construction 0.79%, religious service 0.64%, rent and remittance 0.15% and others 14.92%.
Ownership of agricultural land Landowner 48.95%, landless 51.05%; agricultural landowner: urban 52.53% and rural 49.88%.

Main crops Tea, Paddy, potato, bay leaf, betel leaf.

Extinct or nearly extinct crops Tobacco.

Main fruits Jackfruit, pineapple, betel nut.

Main exports
Natural Gas, pebble, limestone, tea, bay leaf, betel leaf, betel nut.

Points of interest
Jaintiapur Rajbari, Jaintiapur Hill Resort, Sreepur Tea Garden, Lalakhal Tea Garden, Saytreast Research Centers, 8 No Mountain, Haripur Utlar Hill, Haripur Black Mountain, Lalakhal Tea Estate, Nazimgarh Wilderness Resorts, Lalakhal, Shari-Goyain River ( The only blue water river of Bangladesh ),

File: Jaflong valley school.

Administration
Jaintiapur Upazila is divided into six union parishads: Charikata, Chiknagul, Darbast, Fatehpur, Jaintiapur, and Nijpat. The union parishads are subdivided into 135 mauzas and 174 villages.

Infrastructure
Pucca road 228 km, mud road 59 km. Culvert 99, Bridge 25.

Upazila health complex 1, family planning centre 5, satellite clinic 2, community clinic 19.

Education

Literacy rate and educational institutions Average literacy 35.11%; male 39.51%, female 30.34%. Educational institutions: college 5, secondary school 16, primary school 53, community school 11, kindergarten 5, madrasa 23. Noted educational institutions: Jaintia Degree College (1987), Jaintiapur Tayob Ali Degree College (1995), Imran Ahmad Government Women's College (1999), Central Jaintiapur High School (1955), Haripur High School (1957), Jaintiapur Government High School (1867).

Gallery

See also
 Jaintia Rajbari
 Upazilas of Bangladesh
 Districts of Bangladesh
 Divisions of Bangladesh

References

 
Upazilas of Sylhet District